Preston Riverside railway station is the only station on the heritage Ribble Steam Railway, in Riversway, Preston, Lancashire, England. It was built and opened in 2005, adjacent to the museum and workshops, while providing a heritage service to Strand Road Crossing.

The basic station is one platform, which can accommodate 5 coaches, built onto the side of the museum of the railway. Opposite the station, there is a single siding for storage of bitumen tanks, and one run-round loop.  There is very little on the actual station, however there are a couple of plant pots, benches and information displays.

Services from the station are hourly, and they go to the Strand Road Crossing. These services are only available during the railway operating season and on special events.

References

Heritage railway stations in Preston
Ribble Steam Railway
Railway stations in Great Britain opened in 2005
Railway stations built for UK heritage railways